Lalitha Ravish (alternatively spelt Lalitha Raveesh) is an Indian politician and the former mayor of Tumkur, Karnataka, India. She is a Janata Dal (Secular) politician.

Career 
Ravish is a Janata Dal (Secular)  politician. In January 2015, in the Tumakuru City Municipal Corporation election she was elected as the mayor of the city. Roopa from the Bharatiya Janata Party was elected as the deputy mayor.

References 

Living people
Year of birth missing (living people)
Women members of the Karnataka Legislative Assembly